Graham Charles Eggleton is a Scottish former athlete who specialised in the pole vault.

As a child, Eggleton would train in his garden by vaulting onto piles of hay with a bamboo pole.

Eggleton was the British national pole vault champion in 1981 and 1982.

The first vaulter from Scotland to clear five metres, Eggleton had a personal best vault of 5.21 metres set in 1982, which remained a Scottish record until bettered by Richard Hurren in 2010.

Eggleton competed at the 1982 Commonwealth Games in Brisbane and was one of three vaulters to register a games record of 5.20 metres, but had to settle for the bronze medal on countback.

References

Year of birth missing (living people)
Living people
British male pole vaulters
Scottish male athletes
Commonwealth Games bronze medallists for Scotland
Commonwealth Games medallists in athletics
Medallists at the 1982 Commonwealth Games
Athletes (track and field) at the 1982 Commonwealth Games